Dreadstar was the first comic-book series published by American publisher Epic Comics, an imprint of Marvel Comics, in 1982. It was centered on Vanth Dreadstar, sole survivor of the entire Milky Way galaxy, and an ensemble cast of crewmates, including cyborg sorcerer Syzygy Darklock, and their struggle to end an ancient war between two powerful, evil empires: The Church of The Instrumentality, run by the Lord Papal; and the Monarchy, administered by a puppet king.

The comic book, created by Jim Starlin, was bimonthly during most of its run. Epic published 26 issues, after which it was published by First Comics who carried it for 38 more issues, for a total of 64 issues. The first 41 issues were published bi-monthly, after which the book was published monthly for a time, though it resumed bi-monthly publication with issue 51. In the early 1990s, a six issue limited series was published by Malibu Comics' Bravura line of creator-owned titles. Jim Starlin had stated in interviews as early as 2000 that he was working on a new Dreadstar series titled "Class Warfare" (including sample artwork in Slave Labor Graphics' The Price trade paperback), but the last mention of this was in late 2002. In 2011, in promotion for Breed III, Starlin again mentioned the possibility of another Dreadstar series. In April 2020, Jim Starlin announced a crowd-funding project for an all-new 100-page story featuring Dreadstar illustrated by Starlin himself together with inker Jaime Jameson titled Dreadstar Returns.

Within the Marvel Multiverse, the Dreadstar universe is designated as Earth-8116.

Metamorphosis Odyssey

Vanth Dreadstar first appeared in "The Metamorphosis Odyssey", in Epic Illustrated #3. In the story, where Dreadstar is not the main character, he unwittingly aids the Orsirosian named Akhnaton in destroying the Milky Way Galaxy, the only way to stop the ever-expanding Zygotean empire.

Dreadstar reappears in Marvel Graphic Novel #3, where Dreadstar tries to adjust to a new life on a pastoral world in the Empirical Galaxy, one million years after the Milky Way's destruction, only for his new home to be wiped out in a military attack. The story happens simultaneously with The Price, a graphic novel published by Eclipse Comics, which introduces the magician Syzygy Darklock. The stories become interwoven in each other's final pages, when the characters meet. Dreadstar and Darklock later appear in a short story in Epic Illustrated #15, which sets up the new bimonthly series.

Epic Comics
The series centered on the exploits of Vanth Dreadstar and his crew—powerful mystic Syzygy Darklock, the cybernetic telepath Willow, cat-like humanoid Oedi, and freebooter Skeevo. Vanth, newly arrived in the Empirical Galaxy after the events of Metamorphosis Odyssey, tries to live a pastoral existence on Oedi's planet of peaceful cat-people, but his peace is disturbed by the arrival of Darklock, who wants him to get involved in the conflict between the two major forces in the galaxy, the Monarchy and the theocratical Instrumentality. Vanth refuses until the war comes to his planet, wiping out most of the population. Oedi survives and joins them; Willow and Skeevo join later, though the team is in place for the first issue.

Dreadstar takes the side of the Monarchy against the evil Lord High Papal of the Instrumentality, but his team end up becoming fugitives when the Monarchy falls, and go to great lengths to try to uncover a traitor in their midst. The series transitioned to First Comics just when the traitor was about to be revealed, and issue #27, the first issue published under First Comics, contained this revelation.

First Comics
The downfall of the Instrumentality came swiftly after the transition to First Comics. Dreadstar, severely injured, went into a coma and awakened in the aftermath of the war—a bureaucracy where those with extraordinary powers, like himself, are commissioned as policemen to track down others of their kind. Eventually, Willow takes over the master computer, and Dreadstar and his friends leave the galaxy again.

Peter David took over the writing duties with issue #41 (March 1989) after Jim Starlin left the title, and remained on it until issue #64 (March 1991), the final issue of that run. Stranded in a nonfunctional ship between galaxies, the crew finds a baby floating in space, who quickly grows to maturity. It is later revealed that the baby is the personification of the Twelve Gods of the Instrumentality, which fled the Empirical Galaxy. Dreadstar finds himself once again in a galactic conflict, except that in the end he discovers he has taken the wrong side. He changes sides just in time, but the personification of the twelve gods had by this point merged with the sword of power of that galaxy and regained their full might. However they were defeated and the gods of the galaxy they were in began to take him prisoner in their realm. As he was being taken away, Dreadstar took the spirit of his teammate Iron Angel with him and then fulfilled a curse that was cast upon him (Dreadstar) that for as long as Dreadstar lived, so would the High Lord Papal. Papal was revived and empowered and battled Dreadstar until Papal's energies got too depleted and he realized it was a different galaxy and fled.

Crossroads
During the First Comics run, the publisher released the Crossroads mini-series which featured team-ups of the company's major characters. One issue involved Grimjack, Nexus, and Dreadstar. This was alluded to in a later issue of Dreadstar, with several flashback panels depicting Dreadstar alongside Nexus.

Malibu
The Malibu series takes place several years later, with the Lord High Papal training Vanth Dreadstar's daughter Kalla. The characters from the original series, except Oedi, show up, and the series climaxes in Dreadstar apparently being accidentally killed by his own daughter.

In issue #6, the final issue, Dreadstar is alive and back to his old self by the end of the story.

Image
Dreadstar and Oedi appear on the last page of 'Breed III #5 and in issue #6 along with other of Starlin's creations, such as Wyrd and Kid Kosmos as part of the "Elsewhere Alliance". This story also explains where Oedi disappeared to during the last Dreadstar mini-series.

TV adaptation
In February 2015, a deal with Universal Cable Productions was announced to adapt Dreadstar as a scripted TV series with Chris Bender and J. C. Spink as producers. These plans were put on indefinite hold due to Spink's unexpected death.

Reprints
In the early 2000s SLG Publishing reprinted the Metamorphosis Odyssey and the first few issues of the Epic series in four black-and-white volumes.  
 Dreadstar Volume 1: Metamorphosis Odyssey
 Dreadstar Volume 2: The Price
 Dreadstar Volume 3: Plan M
 Dreadstar Volume 4: The Secret of Z

In 2004 Dynamite Entertainment reprinted the first 12 issues of the Epic series in two full-color volumes.
 Dreadstar Definitive Collection Volume 1 Part 1
 Dreadstar Definitive Collection Volume 1 Part 2 — Vol 1 Part 2 contained an ad promising Vol 2 in 2005 but has not yet been published.

Dynamite announced a full-color collection of the Metamorphosis Odyssey in February 2010.

A Kickstarter campaign was announced to publish a three-volume set of the complete story.

Notes

External links

Izak (Dreadstar ally). The Appendix to the Handbook of the Marvel Universe. 
Burgas, Greg. "Comics you should own – Dreadstar #1-40" . Comic Book Resources. September 22, 2006
Burgas, Greg. "Comics you should own – Dreadstar #41-64" . Comic Book Resources. September 22, 2006

First Comics titles
Malibu Comics titles
1982 comics debuts
Epic Comics characters
Dynamite Entertainment titles
Marvel Comics male superheroes
Comics set on fictional planets
Superhero comics